Bayenghem-lès-Éperlecques (literally Bayenghem near Éperlecques) is a commune in the Pas-de-Calais department in the Hauts-de-France region in northern France.

Geography
and the A16 autoroute.

Population

Sights
 The eighteenth century church of St. Wandrille.
 Traces of a motte-and-bailey castle.

See also
Communes of the Pas-de-Calais department

References

External links

 Official Regional Tourist Office website 

Communes of Pas-de-Calais